Lawrence Mhlanga (born 20 December 1993), is a Zimbabwean footballer who plays for Platinum Zvishavane of the Zimbabwe Premier Soccer League and the Zimbabwe national football team as a defender.

Club career
Mhlanga started his career with Bantu Rovers before moving to Monomotapa United in 2013. He joined Chicken Inn in 2014, and rejected a move to Zambian side Power Dynamos in early 2017, just before the 2017 Africa Cup of Nations.

International career
Mhlanga was called up to the Zimbabwe national football team by head coach Callisto Pasuwa for the 2017 Africa Cup of Nations.

Career statistics

International

International goals
Scores and results list Zimbabwe's goal tally first.

References

1993 births
Living people
Association football defenders
Zimbabwean footballers
Zimbabwe international footballers
Bantu Tshintsha Guluva Rovers F.C. players
Chicken Inn F.C. players
2017 Africa Cup of Nations players
2019 Africa Cup of Nations players
Zimbabwe A' international footballers
2016 African Nations Championship players